Shawn James Robert Belle (born January 3, 1985) is a Canadian former professional  ice hockey defenceman who played in the National Hockey League (NHL) with the Minnesota Wild, Montreal Canadiens, Edmonton Oilers and the Colorado Avalanche.

Playing career
As a youth, Belle played in the 1998 Quebec International Pee-Wee Hockey Tournament with a minor ice hockey team from Edmonton.

Belle was a highly touted prospect playing for the Tri-City Americans of the Western Hockey League (WHL) when he was drafted by the St. Louis Blues in the 1st round, 30th overall in the 2003 NHL Entry Draft. After being drafted, Belle returned to the Americans and played for 2 more years there. Belle has spent time with Team Canada’s junior program. He has played on the U-18 gold medal teams in 2003 as well as the U-20 team in 2003 and 2004. He also participated in the 2003 and 2004 Canada-Russia Challenge, while representing Team WHL and represented North America in the America Japan challenge.

Japan lead 6-4 in the challenge before Belle's goal sparked a 4 goal burst by North America, who won in a final score of 8-7. The next year Belle's penalty in triple OT cost North America as they fell 1-0.

During the 2004–2005 season, Belle was traded to the Dallas Stars.   For the 2005–2006 season, Belle turned pro and joined the Stars minor league affiliate, the Iowa Stars. He played 45 games with the Stars before being traded to the Minnesota Wild and joining their affiliate, the Houston Aeros, for the remainder of the season. For the 2006–2007 season, Belle played the majority of the year with the Aeros but also made his NHL debut with the Wild, skating in 9 games and recording 1 assist.

On July 11, 2008, Belle was traded to the Montreal Canadiens for forward Corey Locke.

After two seasons within the Canadiens organization, Belle signed as a free agent to a one-year contract with hometown team, the Edmonton Oilers on July 13, 2010. On February 28, 2011, Belle was traded by the Oilers to the Colorado Avalanche in exchange for defenceman Kevin Montgomery.

Belle signed a contract abroad as a free agent with Adler Mannheim of the German DEL on September 10, 2011.

After two seasons in Mannheim, Belle signed a one-year contract in the Swedish Hockey League with Färjestad BK on June 10, 2013.

On June 16, 2014, Belle continued his European journey in signing a one-year contract in the Kontinental Hockey League with Croatian team KHL Medveščak Zagreb. Prior to the 2014–15 season, he was released from his contract without appearing for the club due to a pre-existing injury on August 31, 2014. On November 10, 2014, having recovered to full health, Belle made a return to Germany in signing for the remainder of the season with Düsseldorfer EG.

On July 23, 2015, Belle signalled the end of his professional playing career, in agreeing to an assistant coach role with the Sherwood Park Crusaders of the Alberta Junior Hockey League.

Personal life
Belle is of Barbadian descent through his father.

Career statistics

Regular season and playoffs

International

Transactions
 June 21, 2003 - Drafted by the St. Louis Blues in the 1st round, 30th overall.
 June 25, 2004 - Traded to the Dallas Stars for Jason Bacashihua.
 March 9, 2006 - Traded by the Stars to the Minnesota Wild with Martin Skoula for Willie Mitchell and a 2nd round pick in 2007.
 July 11, 2008 - Traded by the Wild to the Montreal Canadiens for Corey Locke.
 July 13, 2010 - Signed a one-year deal with the Edmonton Oilers.
 February 28, 2011 - Traded by the Oilers to Colorado Avalanche for Kevin Montgomery.

See also
List of black NHL players

References

External links

1985 births
Living people
Adler Mannheim players
Black Canadian ice hockey players
Canadian expatriate ice hockey players in Germany
Canadian expatriate ice hockey players in Sweden
Canadian expatriate ice hockey players in the United States
Canadian ice hockey defencemen
Canadian people of Barbadian descent
Colorado Avalanche players
Düsseldorfer EG players
Edmonton Oilers players
Färjestad BK players
Hamilton Bulldogs (AHL) players
Houston Aeros (1994–2013) players
Iowa Stars players
Lake Erie Monsters players
Minnesota Wild players
Montreal Canadiens players
National Hockey League first-round draft picks
Oklahoma City Barons players
Regina Pats players
Ice hockey people from Edmonton
St. Louis Blues draft picks
Tri-City Americans players